Taraxacum holmboei, the Troödos dandelion, is a rosulate perennial herb, up to 10 cm high. Leaves simple, all in rosette, deeply divided (pinnatifid), with deltoid-acute lobes, glabrous, oblong in outline, 3.5-10 x 8-2.5 cm. Flowers in capitula, with yellow, ligulate florets, flowering May–June (hysteranthous, flowers appearing after leaf development). Fruit a pappose achene.

Habitat 
Open pine forests, roadsides, dry hillsides with open vegetation on igneous rocks at 1100–1950 m altitude.

Distribution 
Endemic to Cyprus where it is confined to the Troödos Mountains where it is locally common: Platania, Karvounas, Troodos Square, Almyrolivadho, Khionistra and Prodromos.

Etymology
It is named in honour of the Norwegian botanist Jens Holmboe (1880 – 1943).

Cytology
The diploid chromosome count is 2n = 12.

Conservation
It is categorized as vulnerable (VU) by The Red Data Book of the flora of Cyprus.

References

External links
 http://www.shutterstock.com/pic-973769/stock-photo-taraxacum-holmboei-wildflower-of-cyprus.html
 http://www.plantbuzz.com/Alpine-L/ATOW/page52.jpg

holmboei
Endemic flora of Cyprus